Driving to Damascus is the eighth studio album by Scottish rock band Big Country. It was released in 1999 as both a standard edition and a limited edition digipack, and with bonus tracks in 2002. In the U.S., it was released under a different name, John Wayne's Dream. The limited edition version featured different cover artwork, and included two tracks by Stuart Adamson's alt-country side project, The Raphaels ("Shattered Cross" and "Too Many Ghosts", subsequently released on the 2001 album "Supernatural"), although there was no indication in the credits that these were not by Big Country. 

Driving to Damascus marks the band's last studio album to feature vocalist Stuart Adamson (who would die in 2001) and bassist Tony Butler (who retired from the band in 2012), and the last studio album until The Journey was released in 2013 with the Alarm vocalist Mike Peters taking over for Adamson and Simple Minds bassist Derek Forbes replacing Butler.

The album was re-released on both CD and vinyl format to celebrate the band's 30th anniversary in 2012.

Track listing

Charts

References

1999 albums
Big Country albums
Track Records albums
Albums recorded at Rockfield Studios